You Want It Darker is the fourteenth studio album by Canadian singer-songwriter Leonard Cohen, released on October 21, 2016, by Columbia Records, 17 days before Cohen's death. The album was created at the end of his life and focuses on death, God, and humor. It was released to critical acclaim. The title track was awarded a Grammy Award for Best Rock Performance in January 2018. It was Cohen's last album released during his lifetime and was followed by the posthumous album Thanks for the Dance in November 2019.

Background
After touring extensively between 2008 and 2013, Leonard Cohen began to suffer "multiple fractures of the spine" among other physical problems, according to his son Adam Cohen. Due to Leonard Cohen's mobility issues, You Want It Darker was recorded in the living room of his home in Mid-Wilshire, Los Angeles and then sent by e-mail to his musical collaborators.

Cohen has said his condition helped him eliminate any distractions during the recording of the album: "In a certain sense, this particular predicament is filled with many fewer distractions than other times in my life and actually enables me to work with a little more concentration and continuity than when I had duties of making a living, being a husband, being a father". Despite his medical condition, Adam Cohen said that "occasionally, in bouts of joy, he would even, through his pain, stand up in front of the speakers, and we'd repeat a song over and over like teenagers".

Music
Musically, the album is "a little bit more sparse and acoustic" compared to his recent albums, according to Adam Cohen. Blues dominates the album.

Critical reception

You Want It Darker received widespread acclaim from music critics. At Metacritic, which assigns a normalized rating out of 100 to reviews from mainstream critics, the album received an average score of 92, which indicates "universal acclaim", based on 28 reviews.

Accolades

Commercial performance
In Canada, You Want It Darker debuted atop the album charts, with 19,400 in traditional sales and a total of 20,000 units. The album occupied the top position for three consecutive weeks and sold 106,000 units by the end of the year in Canada.
In the United States, You Want It Darker debuted at number 10 on the Billboard 200 with 25,000 units, 24,000 of which were pure album sales. It is Cohen's second American top 10 album. In the United Kingdom, the album debuted at number four on the UK Albums Chart, selling 20,330 copies in its first week and becoming Leonard Cohen's fifth top 10 album in the UK.
The album reached No. 1 on the Flemish Albums Chart and stayed there for 7 weeks.

Track listing

Personnel
 Leonard Cohen – vocals
 Athena Andreadis – background vocals on "Traveling Light"
 Bill Bottrell – electric guitar, pedal steel guitar
 Michael Chaves – keyboards, bass guitar, drum programming
 Adam Cohen – classical guitar
 Dana Glover – background vocals on "On the Level" and "Steer Your Way"
 Alison Krauss – background vocals on "Steer Your Way"
 Patrick Leonard – keyboards, organ, piano, bass synthesizer, bass guitar, percussion, drum programming
 Howard Bilerman – engineer on "You Want It Darker" and "It Seemed the Better Way"
 Rob Humphreys – drums
 Brian MacLeod – drums
 Shaar Hashomayim Synagogue Choir (Roï Azoulay, Director; Cantor Gideon Zelermyer, vocal)
 Zac Rae – guitar, classical guitar, mandolin, keyboards, Mellotron, celesta, piano, Wurlitzer, floor tom, octophone

Charts

Weekly charts

Year-end charts

Certifications

References

External links
 

2016 albums
Leonard Cohen albums
Albums produced by Patrick Leonard
Columbia Records albums
Juno Award for Album of the Year albums